Derya Tınkaoğlu (born 3 April 1988) is a Turkish women's handballer, who plays in the Turkish Women's Handball Super League for İzmir Büyükşehir Belediyesi SK, and the Turkey national team. The -tall sportswoman plays as goalkeeper.

Playing career

Club
Derya Tinkaoğlu began her handball carre in 2004 at Kastamonu Bld. GSK in her hometown. After one season with the Istanbul-based club Üsküdar Bld. SK in 2007–08, she transferred to İzmir Büyükşehir Bld. SK, where she was until 2011. She played then for Maliye Milli Piyango SK, Çankaya Bld. Anka SK in Ankara and Muratpaşa Bld. SK in Antalya one season each. In the 2014–15 season, she returned to her former team İzmir Büyükşehir Belediyesi SK.

Tinkaoğlu took part at the Women's EHF Cup matches with Kastamonu Bld. GSK (2003–04), with Üsküdar Bld. SK (2007–08), with İzmir Büyükşehir Bld. SK (2009–10, 2010–11), with  Maliye Milli Piyango SK (2011–12), with Çankaya Bld. Anka SK (2012–13). She played at the  
Women's EHF Champions League for  Muratpaşa Bld. SK (2013–14). Further, she participated at the Women's EHF Cup Winners' Cup for Muratpaşa Bld. SK (EHF Women's Cup Winners' Cup 2013/14) and for İzmir Büyükşehir Bld. SK (2008–09, 2014–15 and 2015–16).

International
Tinkaoğlu played at the 2011 World Women's Handball Championship, 2012 European Women's Handball Championship qualification, and 2013 Mediterranean Games held in Antalya, Tıurkey.

She took part at the 2014 European Women's Handball Championship qualification, and 
2016 European Women's Handball Championship qualification.

Honours
 Turkish Women's Handball Super League
 Winners (1): 2013–14
 Runners-up (2): 2010–11, 2007–08
 Third place (1): 2012–13

References 

1988 births
People from Konak
Sportspeople from Kastamonu
Turkish female handball players
Kastamonu Bld. SK (women's handball) players
Üsküdar Belediyespor players
Muratpaşa Bld. SK (women's handball) players
İzmir Büyükşehir Belediyespor handball players
Turkey women's national handball players
Living people
Mediterranean Games medalists in handball
Mediterranean Games silver medalists for Turkey
Competitors at the 2009 Mediterranean Games